Grisi may refer to:

 Alfredo Grisi (1900–?), Mexican Olympic fencer
 Carlotta Grisi (1819–1899), Italian ballet dancer, cousin of Giuditta and Giulia
 Giuditta Grisi (1805–1840), Italian mezzo-soprano opera singer, sister of Giulia
 Giulia Grisi (1811–1869), Italian soprano opera singer, sister of Giuditta